Robert Graham Beverly  (July 1, 1925 – October 14, 2009) served in the California State Assembly as a Republican, representing the 46th and 51st district, serving as the Assembly's Minority Leader between 1972 and 1975. He also served in the California State Senate for the 27th and 29th district. During World War II, he served in the United States Marine Corps on the East Coast of United States. Beverly was born in Belmont, Massachusetts. In 2009, he died of Parkinson's disease in Manhattan Beach, California.

References

1925 births
2009 deaths
20th-century American politicians
United States Marines
United States Marine Corps personnel of World War II
Republican Party California state senators
Republican Party members of the California State Assembly